The following list is a complete collection of results for the Tonga national rugby league team.

All-time record

Results

1980s

1990s

2000s

2010s

2020s

See also

Tongan National Rugby League
Tonga National Rugby League
Tonga national rugby league team
Rugby league in Tonga

External links
 Tonga results at rugbyleagueproject.org

Rugby league in Tonga
Tonga national rugby league team
Rugby league-related lists